The University of California Museum of Paleontology (UCMP) is a paleontology museum located on the campus of the University of California, Berkeley.

The museum is within the Valley Life Sciences Building (VLSB), designed by George W. Kelham and completed in 1930. Its collections are primarily intended for research and are, thus, not accessible to the public. A limited number of fossils from the collection is on display in the VLSB. Although located on the Berkeley campus, the museum is the primary locality for storing fossils collected statewide. The original fossils, around which the current collection has grown, were those gathered as part of the California Geological Survey from 1860-1867.

Website 
UCMP was one of the first museums to have its own website in the early 1990s, due to its location within a technology-oriented university with a good Internet connection. The site has been applauded for its use of visually appealing graphics, was nominated for a Webby Award five times, and received a medal from the Smithsonian Institution. It also had a cameo appearance in the movie Deep Impact, albeit under an incorrect name.

Notable figures 
Annie Montague Alexander was the first benefactor of the museum, and led some early expeditions.

Faculty

Many notable paleontologists have worked as staff at UCMP. Dates given after each name indicate when the person was part of the university faculty or working in the museum.

 John C. Merriam (1869–1945)
 Charles Lewis Camp (1921-1975)
 William Diller Matthew (1927–1930)
 Ruben Arthur Stirton (1930–1966)
 Samuel Paul Welles (1940–1997)

Directors 
 Bruce L. Clark (1880-1945)
 William Diller Matthew (1871-1930)
 Charles Lewis Camp (1893-1975)
 Ruben Arthur Stirton (1901-1966)
 Donald E. Savage (1917-1999)
 Joseph T. Gregory (1914-2007)
 William B. N. Berry
 William A. Clemens Jr.
 Jere H. Lipps
 David R. Lindberg
 Roy L. Caldwell
 Charles R. Marshall

See also
Paleontology in California
Museum of Vertebrate Zoology

References

External links 

 UCMP website
 The Paleontology Portal
 Understanding Evolution website

Museums established in 1921
1921 establishments in California
Museum of Paleontology
Paleontology websites
California Museum of Paleontology
Natural history museums in California
Geology museums in California
Museums in Berkeley, California
Arthur Brown Jr. buildings
Science and technology in the San Francisco Bay Area
Dinosaur museums in the United States
Paleontology in California